Nathayil Muthu is a 1973 Indian Tamil-language film directed, produced and written by K. S. Gopalakrishnan. The film stars K. R. Vijaya and R. Muthuraman, publicised as the former's 100th film as an actress. It was released on 25 October 1973.

Plot 
Madhu, the foreign-educated son of a Brahmin lawyer Varadhachari and his wife, falls in love with Chelakannu, an impoverished woman who looks after their cows. While bathing, Chelakannu's sari is washed away and Madhu lends her his clothes. The slum dwellers misconstrue the situation and force Madhu to marry Chelakannu right away, which he willingly does, going to live with her in the slums. However, Chelakannu realises the unfairness of inflicting such discomfort on her husband while his mother schemes to break up the marriage by suggesting Chelakannu is unfaithful to him. Events culminate in a Panchayat which judges in Chelakannu's favour, but when the Panchayat leaders try to abuse Madhu's sister, Chelakannu saves her and this act of generosity persuades Madhu's family that their son's wife is a worthy member of the group.

Cast 
 K. R. Vijaya as Chelakannu
 R. Muthuraman as Madhu
 V. S. Raghavan as Varadhachari
 S. Varalakshmi as Varadhachari's wife
 M. R. R. Vasu
 S. V. Subbiah as Ammasi
 Typist Gopu
 Chandrakantha
 S. Rama Rao
 Kuladeivam Rajagopal
 Indira
 S. R. Janaki

Production 
Nathayil Muthu was directed by K. S. Gopalakrishnan, who also produced and wrote it under the banner Chitra Productions. It was publicised as K. R. Vijaya's 100th film as an actress, and cinematography was handled by P. Ramaswamy.

Soundtrack 
The soundtrack was composed by Shankar–Ganesh, while the lyrics were written by Vaali.

Release and reception 
Nathayil Muthu was released on 25 October 1973. Playing on the title, Kanthan of Kalki said the film had the "nathai" (snail) but no "muthu" (pearl).

Notes

References

External links 
 

1970s Tamil-language films
1973 films
Films directed by K. S. Gopalakrishnan
Films scored by Shankar–Ganesh
Films with screenplays by K. S. Gopalakrishnan